Didwana railway station is a railway station in the Nagaur district, of the Rajasthan state of India. Its code is DIA, and it serves the Didwana town. The station has two platforms. Passenger, Express, and Superfast trains halt here.

Trains

The following trains halt at Didwana railway station in both directions:

 Bandra Terminus–Jammu Tawi Vivek Express
 Jodhpur–Delhi Sarai Rohilla Superfast Express
 Salasar Express
 Bhagat Ki Kothi–Kamakhya Express
 Bandra Terminus–Hisar Superfast Express

References

Railway stations in Nagaur district
Jodhpur railway division